Kyoshi  may refer to:
Kyoshi Takahama (1874–1959), Japanese poet
Kyoshi Miura (born 1961), Japanese cyclist
Avatar Kyoshi, a fictional supporting character from Avatar: The Last Airbender and The Legend of Korra. She has two novels centering on her journey as the Avatar, The Rise of Kyoshi and The Shadow of Kyoshi 
Kyōshi, a form of Japanese poetry
Kyōshi, a Japanese honorific

See also
Kiyoshi (disambiguation)